Drury railway station was a station on the North Island Main Trunk line in New Zealand. It was a stop for southern services on the Auckland railway network.

The Auckland and Drury Railway Act 1863 was passed by Parliament "to enable the Superintendent of the Province of Auckland to construct a Railway between the Towns of Auckland and Drury with a Branch to Onehunga in the said Province."

The station was opened in October 1874. On 8 December 1918, the existing station was replaced by a new Drury station building on a new site which also replaced the Runciman railway station. On 21 May 1972 the station was closed.

New train stations for Drury West and Paerata are included in a July 2017 proposal for Auckland infrastructure spending of $600 million to support new housing announced by the government. They will be built and owned by a new Crown Infrastructure Partners body, as the Auckland Council has reached its borrowing limit. In 2020, the government announced $247 million in funding for new stations at Drury West and Drury East, to be started in 2023.

See also 
List of Auckland railway stations
Onehunga Branch

References

External links 

 Photo of freight train at Drury

Defunct railway stations in New Zealand
Buildings and structures in the Auckland Region
Rail transport in the Auckland Region
Railway stations opened in 1874
Railway stations closed in 1972